Forish is a district of Jizzakh Region in Uzbekistan. The capital lies at the town Bogʻdon (Yangiqishloq).

The district consists of two urban-type settlements (Bogʻdon, Uchquloch) and 10 rural communities (Omonkeldi, Darvoza, Arnasoy, Qoraabdol, Egizbuloq, Qizilqum, Forish, Uxum, Garasha, Osmonsoy).

References 

Districts of Uzbekistan
Jizzakh Region